Angelina Pavlovna Goncharenko (born 23 May 1994) is a Russian ice hockey defenceman and captain of SKIF Nizhny Novgorod of the Zhenskaya Hockey League (ZhHL).

International career
Goncharenko was selected for the Russia women's national ice hockey team in the 2014 Winter Olympics. She played in all six games, not recording a point.

As of 2014, Goncharenko has also appeared for Russia at two IIHF Women's World Championships. Her first appearance came in 2012. She won a bronze medal as a part of the team in 2013.

Goncharenko made three appearances for the Russia women's national under-18 ice hockey team, at the IIHF World Women's U18 Championships, with the first in 2010.

Career statistics

International career
Through 2013–14 season

References

External links

1994 births
Living people
Ice hockey players at the 2014 Winter Olympics
Ice hockey players at the 2018 Winter Olympics
Olympic ice hockey players of Russia
Russian women's ice hockey defencemen
Ice hockey people from Moscow
Universiade medalists in ice hockey
Universiade gold medalists for Russia
Competitors at the 2015 Winter Universiade
Competitors at the 2017 Winter Universiade
HC Tornado players
HC SKIF players
Ice hockey players at the 2022 Winter Olympics